Marcelino Junior Lopes Arruda (born May 8, 1989), better known as Mazola, is a Brazilian footballer who plays for Arema FC as a forward.

Career
Hired by São Paulo for the period 2008-2011, played in the Copa Sudamericana in 2008 and did not score.

Before going to São Paulo, was part of the basic categories of the Portuguesa (for which he was champion São Paulo child) and Ituano.

Was loaned to São Paulo in 2009 and stayed until the end of the Campeonato Paulista in 2010, and again borrowed, this time the Guarani of Campinas, to compete in the Campeonato Brasileiro in 2010 until the end of the year, where he has scored 7 goals. In an interview with globoesporte.com, he said:-It 's all right. I signed a contract with Al-Jazira and this was done to keep the Ricardo Oliveira on loan at São Paulo. I was happy to have set the transfer. In São Paulo, I had no chance to play, would be just one - said the athlete.

Club statistics

References

External links
 

 Mazola at Urawa Red Diamonds official site 
 Mazola at zerozerofootball.com 
 Mazola at Yahoo! Japan sports 
 

1989 births
Living people
People from Guarulhos
Brazilian footballers
Brazilian expatriate footballers
Associação Portuguesa de Desportos players
Ituano FC players
Paulista Futebol Clube players
São Paulo FC players
Guarani FC players
Urawa Red Diamonds players
Zhejiang Professional F.C. players
Portimonense S.C. players
Figueirense FC players
Ceará Sporting Club players
Guizhou F.C. players
Jeonbuk Hyundai Motors players
Clube de Regatas Brasil players
Esporte Clube São Bento players
Tractor S.C. players
Clube Atlético Juventus players
Sociedade Esportiva e Recreativa Caxias do Sul players
Campeonato Brasileiro Série A players
Campeonato Brasileiro Série B players
J1 League players
Chinese Super League players
China League One players
Persian Gulf Pro League players
Association football forwards
Brazilian expatriate sportspeople in Japan
Brazilian expatriate sportspeople in China
Brazilian expatriate sportspeople in Portugal
Brazilian expatriate sportspeople in South Korea
Brazilian expatriate sportspeople in Iran
Expatriate footballers in Japan
Expatriate footballers in China
Expatriate footballers in Portugal
Expatriate footballers in South Korea
Expatriate footballers in Iran
Footballers from São Paulo (state)